David Carle (born November 9, 1989) is an American ice hockey coach who is currently in charge of the program at Denver.

Career
Hailing from Alaska, Carle attended high school at Shattuck-Saint Mary's in Faribault, Minnesota. After his career at Shattuck, Carle was projected to be a second-round pick in the 2008 NHL entry draft. While preparing for the 2008 NHL Entry Draft an abnormality was detected during the NHL combine and after undergoing tests at the Mayo Clinic Carle was diagnosed with hypertrophic cardiomyopathy, an enlargement of a heart muscle. While the genetic abnormality is not immediately life-threatening, it has been shown to be a leading cause of sudden death in athletes. The diagnosis caused Carle to retire from hockey as a player, but despite the end of his career he was still drafted by the Tampa Bay Lightning 203rd overall in the seventh and final round. Then-owner Oren Koules's son attended Shattuck-Saint Mary's at the same time as Carle; Koules directed GM Jay Feaster to select Carle in recognition of Carle's hard work.

The University of Denver honored the scholarship it had offered to Carle and he began attending the school in the fall of 2008. Wanting to keep him as part of the team, head coach George Gwozdecky offered Carle a place as an assistant coach with the program as long as he was a student at Denver. What started out as a tentative effort to see if Carle was still interested in the game eventually turned into a full-time position. After graduating in 2012, Carle joined the Green Bay Gamblers as an assistant coach but returned to Denver less than two years later as an assistant under new head coach Jim Montgomery. Carle stayed with the Pioneers for four years, helping the team win the 2017 National Championship, before he replaced Montgomery as head coach in 2018.

In 2018-2019, Carle led the Denver Pioneers to the Frozen Four in his first season as head coach.

In 2021-2022, Carle led the Denver Pioneers into the Frozen Four as a #1 seed (4th overall), where they defeated Minnesota State Mavericks men's ice hockey 5-1 in the NCAA Finals on April 9, 2022.

Personal life
Carle has two brothers who also played hockey. Older brother Matt played for Denver, winning two national titles and a Hobey Baker Award, before embarking on an 11-year career in the NHL. His younger brother Alex played for Merrimack College.

In 2018 he married Melissa Lewis, a former tennis player at Drexel University.

Head coaching record

References

External links
 Official biography, Denver Pioneers
 

1989 births
Living people
American ice hockey coaches
Denver Pioneers men's ice hockey coaches
Tampa Bay Lightning draft picks
Ice hockey people from Alaska
Ice hockey people from Anchorage, Alaska